Lima is a station on Line 1 of the Milan Metro. It was opened on 1 November 1964 as part of the inaugural section of the Metro, between Sesto Marelli and Lotto.

The station is located at Piazza Lima, which is approximately half of Corso Buenos Aires in the municipality of Milan. This is an underground station with two tracks in a single barrel.

References

External links

Line 1 (Milan Metro) stations
Railway stations opened in 1964
1964 establishments in Italy
Railway stations in Italy opened in the 20th century